The following is an overview of Public housing estates in Kwai Chung, Hong Kong, including Home Ownership Scheme (HOS), Private Sector Participation Scheme (PSPS), Sandwich Class Housing Scheme (SCHS), Flat-for-Sale Scheme (FFSS), and Tenants Purchase Scheme (TPS) estates.

Overview

Estates

Cho Yiu Chuen

Cho Yiu Chuen consists of 8 residential buildings with a total of 2,532 units, which were built in 1977, 1978 and 1981. It also provides elderly persons flats at Chung Ling Sheh. It was named for Sir Cho Yiu Kwan, one of the founders of Hong Kong Housing Society. It received a Certificate of Merit at the 1981 Hong Kong Institute of Architects Annual Awards.

Kai King Lau is the tallest building in Cho Yiu Chuen with 38 storeys. It was also the tallest public housing building in the world at that time.

Hibiscus Park

Hibiscus Park is a SCHS estate in Kwai Chung, near Kwai Chung Sports Ground, Kwai Fong. Formerly the site of Kwai Hong Temporary Housing Area, it consists of 2 blocks built in 1998.

Highland Park

Highland Park is a SCHS estate, developed by the HKHS and situated at the mid-level of Lai King Hill, Kwai Chung. Formerly the site of Lai King Temporary Housing Area, It has totally 6 blocks built in 1999, offering 1,456 flats.

High Prosperity Terrace

High Prosperity Terrace was PSPS estate which was jointly by the Hong Kong Housing Authority and Supertime Holdings. However, it was transferred to rental public housing estate in 2002. Its rent are now fixed at 10% above the best rents of the district concerned in view of their higher standard of finishes and fittings. It has two residential buildings, completed in 2003. Formerly the site of Kwai Lok Temporary Housing Area,

Kwai Chun Court

Kwai Chun Court is a HOS court in Kwai Chung, near Kwai Hing Estate. It has 3 blocks built in 1995.

Kwai Chung Estate

Kwai Chung Estate is now under the management of the Hong Kong Housing Authority (HKHA). The phase 1 and phase 3–5 of its redevelopment were completed progressively in 1998, 2000 and 2005. Starting from 1993, the Housing Department has embarked on the redevelopment of Kwai Chung Estate. After 12 years of work, the entire redevelopment project was realised in 2005. Being the largest public housing estate in Hong Kong, Kwai Chung Estate provides 11,759 rental flats for about 33,300 people. The redevelopment works also include realignment of Sheung Kok Street, road improvement works and the allocation of 800 flats in Kwai Fuk Court for disciplined services quarters. It features commercial centre, carpark, public transport interchange, post office, social welfare and recreational facilities. Pak Kwai House and Hop Kwai House were built of the site of the former Kwai Chung Factory Estate.

Kwai Fong Estate

Kwai Fong Estate (Chinese: 葵芳邨) is built on the reclaimed land of Gin Drinkers Bay, later the town centre of Kwai Chung, and the south of Kwai Hing Estate. Kwai Fong station is named from the name of the estate. It comprises 12 buildings with a total of 6400 units and 1 shopping arcade. Before redevelopment, it consisted of 11 buildings which were completed between 1971 and 1973. In 1982, the buildings were revealed to have structural defects. In 1985, the HKHA announced that the strength of the concrete in blocks 8, 9, 10 and 11 of Kwai Fong Estate was below standard. Those blocks were demolished between 1985 and 1989. Other old buildings were also demolished in the 1990s to cope with the estate redevelopment. The estate was later redeveloped with 12 new buildings built between 1987 and 2002.

Kwai Hing Estate

Kwai Hing Estate (Chinese: 葵興邨) was built in the valley of Gin Drinkers Bay, later the town centre of Kwai Chung. Kwai Hing station is named after the name of the estate. It comprises 4 buildings with a total of 400 rental units (TPS units excluded) and 1 shopping arcade. Before redevelopment, it consisted of 5 buildings which were completed between 1970 and 1972. In 1985, the HKHA announced that the strength of the concrete in blocks 3, 4 and 5 of Kwai Hing Estate were below standard. All the blocks were later demolished between 1988 and 1992 to cope with the estate redevelopment. The estate was later redeveloped with 5 buildings between 1991 and 1992.

Kwai Hong Court

Kwai Hong Court is a HOS court in Kwai Chung, near Sun Kwai Hing Gardens and Kwai Hing station. It consists of two blocks built in 1993.

Kwai Luen Estate

Kwai Luen Estate (Chinese: 葵聯邨) opened on Kwai Luen Road in 2011 with two residential blocks. Two additional houses are under construction on Kwai Shing Circuit. It was one of the public housing estates detected to have excessive lead contents in its water supply in 2015.

Kwai Shing East Estate

Kwai Shing East Estate is located at the east of Kwai Shing West Estate, and now consists of 12 residential buildings and a shopping centre. Kwai Shing East Estate was formerly Kwai Shing Estate which had nine blocks (blocks 12 to 20) completed in 1972 and 1973. In 1977, these blocks were renamed as Kwai Shing East Estate. In 1985, the HKHA announced that the strength of the concrete in Blocks 18 and 20 of the estate were below standard. Those blocks were demolished in 1989. The remaining blocks (except block 12) were demolished and replaced by new buildings in the 1990s and 2000s. In 1995, Block 12 was converted into Interim Housing temporarily to settle people ineligible for public rental housing. But in 2008, the Hong Kong Housing Authority announced plans to demolish block 12 in 2010.

Kwai Shing West Estate

Kwai Shing West Estate is located at the east of Kwai Shing East Estate, and consists of 10 residential buildings completed between 1975 and 1977.

Kwai Tsui Estate

Kwai Tsui Estate is a public housing estate built on the site of the former Kwai Chung Police Married Quarters, near MTR Kwai Fong station and Kwai Fong Estate. It comprises two domestic blocks, of 23 and 24 storeys respectively, and a three-storey podium. The estate provides about 866 flats that can accommodate a total population of about 2,400 residents. The first tenants moved in on 30 April 2018.

Lai King Estate

Lai King Estate is one of the oldest public housing estates in Kwai Tsing District. It is divided into 2 phases and consists of a total of 8 residential buildings completed in 1975 (Phase 1), 1976 (Phase 2)  and 2022 (Heng King House) respectively. Lai King station is located between the two phases.

Lai Yan Court

Lai Yan Court is a HOS court in Kwai Chung, located near Wah Lai Estate and within walking distance to Mei Foo station. Together with Wah Lai Estate and Nob Hill, it was formerly the site of Lai Chi Kok Amusement Park. It has 3 blocks built in 2001.

Lai Yiu Estate

Lai Yiu Estate is located at the north mid-level of Lai King Estate. It consists of 5 residential buildings completed in 1976, 1977 and 1999 respectively.

Ning Fung Court

Ning Fung Court is a HOS court in North Kwai Chung, located near Shek Yam Estate and Shek Yam East Estate.

On Yam Estate

On Yam Estate is situated on land which was formerly the location of Shek Yam Temporary Housing Area and Shek Lei Temporary Housing Area. The estate consists of 8 residential buildings (in Phase 1 and 2) completed in 1994 and 1995.

Shek Lei Estate

Shek Lei Estate is located near Shek Yam Estate, On Yam Estate and Shek Yam East Estate. The estate separates into three parts, Shek Lei (I) Estate, Shek Lei (II) Estate and Shek Lei Interim Housing. It has totally 22 blocks and 2 shopping centres with the population of about 35,000. It is currently the second largest public housing estates in Kwai Chung.

Shek Yam East Estate

Shek Yam East Estate (Chinese: 石蔭東邨) was developed by the HKHA, and the year of intake was 1996. It was developed on the former site of Tai Pak Tin Temporary Housing Area (Chinese: 大白田臨時房屋區), and not as a redevelopment of Shek Yam Estate. It is therefore considered as an independent estate. Shek Yam East Estate is a comparatively small public housing estate for Hong Kong standards, comprising three 39-floor residential buildings, without market and shopping centre. It comprises a total of 2,500 apartments, with sizes ranging from 13.6 to 49 m2. The authorized population was 6,500 at the end of 2007. The nearby Shek Yam Shopping Centre, located within Shek Yam Estate serves this estate.

Shek Yam Estate

Shek Yam Estate was the first Government Low Cost Housing Scheme estate in Kwai Chung. It had 8 blocks built in 1968, which were all demolished in the 1990s and 2000s.

The estate was redeveloped into 4 phases. Phase 2 consists of three rental residential blocks, a car park podium and a shopping centre which were completed in 2000. Phase 3 consists of four HOS concord-typed blocks, Ning Fung Court. Phase 1 and Phase 4 were handed over to Leisure and Cultural Services Department to construct a park, Sham Yam Lei Muk Road Park. Phase 5 was the old site of Shek Yam Community Hall and a HOS building, but it was renamed Lai Shek House and changed to rental use.

Sheung Man Court

Sheung Man Court is a Home Ownership Scheme court in Texaco Road, Kwai Chung, near Tai Wo Hau Estate and MTR Tai Wo Hau station. It comprises one block with 494 flats in total. Saleable flat area ranges from 26.6 to 42.6 square metres sold from HK$1.77M to HK$3.54M, after applying a 41% discount from the assessed market values. It was sold in 2019 and is expected to complete in 2020.

Although the court is just opposite to Tsuen Wan Town Centre and is named with prefix "Sheung" (another one is Sheung Chui Court), it is located at the east side of Texaco Road and so belongs to Kwai Tsing District instead of Tsuen Wan District.

Tai Wo Hau Estate / Kwai Yin Court

Tsui Yiu Court

Tsui Yiu Court is a HOS court in Lai King Hill, Kwai Chung, near Lai Yiu Estate and Castle Peak Road (Kwai Chung Section). It has 1 block built in 1981.

Wah Lai Estate

Wah Lai Estate consists of two residential buildings completed in 2001.

Although it administratively belongs to Kwai Tsing District, it is very near Mei Foo Sun Chuen, Lai Chi Kok rather than other parts in Kwai Chung. Sham Shui Po District Council requested the government to include the estate into its district, but there are still no changes in the boundary related to the estate. However, the government decided to include the entire Nob Hill, a private housing estate next to Wah Lai Estate, into Sham Shui Po District in 2007.

Yi Fung Court

Yi Fung Court is a HOS court in the upper hill of Shek Lei Extension, Lei Pui Street. It has totally 2 blocks built in 1999.

Yin Lai Court

Yin Lai Court is a HOS court in Kwai Chung, near Lai King Estate and Lai King station. It has two blocks and a shopping centre built in 1991.

Yuet Lai Court

Yuet Lai Court is a HOS court in Kwai Chung, near Lai King Estate and Lai King station. It has totally 4 blocks, located at the east of Lai King Hill Road. It was sold to the public through Home Ownership Scheme Phase 1 in 1981. It is one of the earliest HOS courts in Hong Kong.

References

Kwai Chung